The 2011 Duke Blue Devils football team represented Duke University in the 2011 NCAA Division I FBS football season as a member of the Atlantic Coast Conference (ACC) in the Coastal Division. The Blue Devils were led by fourth-year head coach David Cutcliffe and played their home games at Wallace Wade Stadium. Duke finished the season 3–9 overall and 1–7 in ACC play to place last in the Coastal Division.

Schedule

Game summaries

Richmond

Despite high expectations, Duke lost to FCS opponent Richmond for the third time in six seasons. Down by 2, the Blue Devils missed a 28-yard field goal to take the lead with less than 2 minutes left in the game.

Stanford

Although the Blue Devils kept the first half close, Stanford opened up the game in the second half. The last win for Duke against a top-10 nonconference game was against Stanford in 1971.

Boston College

In its conference opener, Duke broke through for its first win of the season. Sean Renfree set a Duke record with 41 completions, and BC missed a go-ahead 23-yard field goal with 43 seconds left in the game.

Tulane

Following up on a win at BC, Duke scored 5 rushing touchdowns to defeat Tulane by 21 points. Duke's offense was not forced to punt until the fourth quarter.

FIU

Duke won its 3rd game in a row by overcoming a 10-point deficit in the fourth quarter and not committing any turnovers. Conner Vernon and Donovan Varner both had over 100 yards receiving.

Florida State

Wake Forest

Virginia Tech

Miami (FL)

Virginia

Georgia Tech

North Carolina

Roster

Coaching staff

References

External links
 2011 Media Guide

Duke
Duke Blue Devils football seasons
Duke Blue Devils football